Serine/threonine-protein kinase 38-like is an enzyme that in humans is encoded by the STK38L gene.

References

Further reading

EC 2.7.11